Orbliston Junction railway station served the settlement of Orbliston, Moray, Scotland from 1858 to 1964 on the Inverness and Aberdeen Junction Railway.

History 
The station opened on 18 August 1858 by the Inverness and Aberdeen Junction Railway, named Fochabers, though it was 4 km west of the town. Its name was changed to Orbliston Junction on 16 October 1893, when the Highland Railway opened the Fochabers branch line. The branch closed to passengers in 1931, but the name didn't change to Orbliston until 12 September 1960. The station closed to both passengers and goods traffic on 7 December 1964.

References

External links 

Disused railway stations in Moray
Railway stations in Great Britain opened in 1858
Railway stations in Great Britain closed in 1964
Beeching closures in Scotland
1858 establishments in Scotland
1964 disestablishments in Scotland
Former Highland Railway stations